The Woodward Building is a historic two-story building in Payette, Idaho. It was designed by John E. Tourtellotte & Company with "ornate metal cornices" by Charles Oscar Kirkendall, and built in 1908 for Dr. 0. C. Woodward, a physician. 

It has a cavetto between its first and second stories, with modillions at each end.

It has been listed on the National Register of Historic Places since April 26, 1978.

References

National Register of Historic Places in Payette County, Idaho
Commercial buildings completed in 1908
1908 establishments in Idaho